George Swan Nottage (1823 – 11 April 1885) was a British politician, businessman, and photographer. In 1884 he was elected as Lord Mayor of London, and subsequently became the most recent person to die whilst holding the office.

Nottage was born in London in 1823, and spent his early years in Essex. As a young man, he was employed by his uncle Robert Kennard at the Blaenavon Coal and Iron Company.

In 1854 he open a shop in Oxford Street, in the window of which he displayed stereoviews. Seeing those stereoviews quickly sold, Nottage saw a business opportunity and by the end of 1854 he and his cousin, Howard John Kennard, launched the London Stereoscope Company (which later became the London Stereoscopic Company, and then the London Stereoscopic and Photographic Company).

Nottage maintained several other businesses interests, including in the iron trade, real-estate, carpentry, optics, banking, and insurance. A member of the Worshipful Company of Carpenters (of which he was Master in 1884–5), Worshipful Company of Loriners, and Worshipful Company of Spectacle Makers, Nottage served as both Alderman and Sheriff (1877–78) of the City of London, before replacing Sir Robert Fowler as Lord Mayor on 9 November 1884.

Nottage died after a bout of bronchitis (or pleurisy) on 11 April 1885, when still in office. This entitled him to burial in St Paul's Cathedral, where, following a funeral service, his coffin was interred in the crypt.

He was married to Martha Christiana Nottage and had two children, Amy Christiana Nottage and Charles George Nottage. Two months after his death, his wife was granted the title "Widow of a Knight Bachelor" by Queen Victoria.

See also

 City of London Corporation

References

1823 births
1885 deaths
Sheriffs of the City of London
19th-century lord mayors of London
19th-century English politicians